Aaron Lafette Brooks (born March 24, 1976) is a former American football quarterback who played in the National Football League (NFL) for eight seasons, primarily with the New Orleans Saints. He played college football at Virginia and was selected by the Green Bay Packers in the fourth round of the 1999 NFL Draft. After one season with the Packers, he was a member of the Saints for six seasons, where he led the franchise to their first playoff victory in 2000 against the defending Super Bowl champion St. Louis Rams. Brooks also became the first NFL quarterback to eliminate the defending Super Bowl champions in his first career postseason start. During his final season, he played for the Oakland Raiders.

Brooks retired in 2007 as the Saints' leader in season and career touchdown passes. For his accomplishments with the franchise, he was inducted to the New Orleans Saints Hall of Fame in 2014.

Early years
Brooks lived in a public housing project in the East End area of Newport News.  Mentored by Coach Tommy Reamon,  Brooks played high school football and graduated from Homer L. Ferguson High School in Newport News. He was awarded a scholarship to attend the University of Virginia (UVA), from which he graduated in 1999.

College career
Brooks enrolled at the University of Virginia in the fall of 1994 and was a redshirt as a true freshman. He was a back-up to Mike Groh in 1995. He competed with fifth year senior Tim Sherman, whose father Tom was the wide receivers coach, for the starting quarterback job in 1996. The Cavaliers were returning defensive players such as Jamie Sharper, James Farrior, and Ronde Barber. The offense was led by running back Tiki Barber. The coaching staff made Sherman, who had played well against Michigan and Virginia Tech in 1995 after starter Mike Groh went down to injury, the primary quarterback instead of the inexperienced Brooks. Nonetheless, Brooks received playing time in nearly all games and was the primary quarterback in a few. Inconsistent quarterback play by both Brooks and Sherman led to an underachieving season, and Virginia fans still debate the quarterback play of the 1996 season.

Brooks was the starter in 1997. Both Brooks and the team struggled in the early part of the season but surged late to finish the season with a 7–4 record. In 1998, the team got off to a strong start and was briefly in the top ten. The highlight of the year, and Brooks' career, was the season finale at Virginia Tech. The Cavaliers were down 29–7 at halftime, but Brooks led the biggest comeback in school history in the 36–32 victory. The Cavaliers finished the regular season with a 9–2 record, which earned them an invitation to the Peach Bowl where they suffered a 35–33 defeat at the hands of Georgia.

Statistics

Professional career

Green Bay Packers
In 1999, Brooks began his career as a third-string backup to Brett Favre behind second-string quarterback Matt Hasselbeck, taking no snaps during the regular season.

New Orleans Saints
The Packers traded Brooks and tight end Lamont Hall to the New Orleans Saints for linebacker K. D. Williams and the Saints' third round pick in the 2001 draft ahead of the 2000 season.

In his first season with the Saints, Brooks took over as starting quarterback after Jeff Blake was sidelined with a broken foot in the team's 11th game of the season. In his first NFL start, Brooks led the Saints to a 31–24 victory over the St. Louis Rams, becoming the first QB in NFL history to defeat the defending Super Bowl champions on the road in his first career start. Brooks led the team to a 3–2 record in his five starts for an overall 10–6 record, winning the NFC West. In the playoffs, the Saints defeated the Rams, 31–28. The Saints were without their starting running back, Ricky Williams, and lost their best receiver, Joe Horn, early in the game. Brooks threw four touchdown passes to lead the Saints to their first playoff win in franchise history, becoming the first QB in NFL history to eliminate the defending Super Bowl champions in his first career postseason start.  The Saints then lost their Divisional Playoff game to the Minnesota Vikings, 34–16.

In 2001, the Saints went 7–9, ending on a four-game losing streak. In those last four games of the season, the Saints would be outscored by more than 100 points, 160–52. Brooks threw a then franchise record-tying 26 touchdowns and a career best 3,832 passing yards in his first full season as a starting quarterback; he also threw a then-franchise record 22 interceptions.

In 2002, Brooks lead the Saints to a 6–2 record and guided an offense that averaged 32 points a game through the first half of the season before the team imploded in the second half. The Saints went 3–5 to finish the season, losing their last three games to teams eliminated from playoff contention.

2003 was Brooks' most efficient year, compiling an 88.8 quarterback rating, a 3:1 touchdown to interception ratio, and a 59.1% completion rate, all career bests. However, the Saints finished 8–8 and did not make the playoffs.

In 2004, the Saints started 4–8, but finished the season with a four-game winning streak. The Saints almost made the playoffs but lost out on tiebreakers. Brooks threw twice as many interceptions as previous year, with 16, and this was the final year Brooks threw for more than 3,000 in a season.

In late 2005, after losing to the Falcons, the Saints benched Brooks and announced Todd Bouman as the team's starter for the last three games of the season. It was a poor year for Brooks, who threw 17 interceptions and 13 touchdowns.

Oakland Raiders
After being released by the Saints, Brooks was signed by the Oakland Raiders in March 2006. He was the starter going into training camp. In his first regular season game as a Raider, he was sacked 9 times by the San Diego Chargers in a 27–0 loss. Brooks dislocated his shoulder in his second game against the Baltimore Ravens and missed the next several weeks. Second-year quarterback Andrew Walter started the next seven games for Oakland. After a 2–5 record over that span, a healthy Brooks was placed back into the starter's role. Despite slightly improved play, Brooks was unable to lead the defensive Raiders to very much success finishing with a league worst 2–14 record. Brooks also went on to have a career low 61.7 quarterback rating, and again threw more interceptions, eight, than touchdowns, three.

Brooks was released by the Raiders when they did not pick up his option after the 2006 season.

NFL career statistics

Post-playing career
Following his retirement from pro football in 2007, Brooks announced plans to go into property development. Brooks said he will oversee the project through its completion, but Ryan Homes will take over the construction phase once the individual lots are prepped.

Earlier in 2008, he announced plans to invest in Southeast Commerce Center, a redevelopment project in his hometown of Newport News. In a July 2008 interview, Brooks described plans to redevelop part of downtown Newport News, a city that shares many of the same social problems as New Orleans. The multimillion-dollar investment would be a mixed-use development between Jefferson and Terminal avenues and 33rd and 29th streets in the economically depressed East End area., including 190 town houses, a grocery store and retail offerings. Vice Mayor Charles Allen, who has represented the district for 16 years on the Newport News City Council, said that it was "significant that one of our own has taken his resources and other resources to show us that we can do it. It's a good day. It's a good day for our community." Brooks commented, "It's a great opportunity to give back to the community and at the same time let retailers know we don't just have the stigma of being 'bad news,' ... a lot of hard-working, middle-class people that live in the area. I'm just trying to make the area better for them."  As of August 2010, the project had not commenced, but was reported to be back on track after negotiations between Brooks and the city council.

In 2014, Brooks was inducted into the New Orleans Saints Hall of Fame, along with former teammate John Carney. Special celebrations were drawn including a private party in a New Orleans local social events venue. Personalities such as Pharrell Williams, Swizz Beatz, Alicia Keys, Michael Vick and Marcus Vick attended the event.

Personal life
Brooks is the second cousin of Michael and Marcus Vick.

See also
List of most consecutive starts by a National Football League quarterback

References

External links

1976 births
Living people
African-American players of American football
American football quarterbacks
Green Bay Packers players
New Orleans Saints players
Oakland Raiders players
Sportspeople from Newport News, Virginia
Players of American football from Virginia
University of Virginia alumni
Virginia Cavaliers football players
21st-century African-American sportspeople
20th-century African-American sportspeople